

As a city with a long and rich history, Boston, Massachusetts naturally has a great many properties and districts listed on the National Register of Historic Places.  There are 345 properties and districts listed on the National Register in Suffolk County, Massachusetts, including 59 National Historic Landmarks. The city of Boston is the location of 323 of these properties and districts, including 58 National Historic Landmarks. Properties and districts located in the county's other three municipalities are listed separately.

Current listings
Because of the large number of listings, the list has been split into northern and southern listings, divided by the Massachusetts Turnpike.  Two historic districts overlap into both northern and southern Boston: the 1767 Milestones, and the Olmsted Park System.

See also 
 List of National Historic Landmarks in Massachusetts
 National Register of Historic Places listings in Massachusetts

References

History of Boston
Boston
 
Boston Massachusetts